Demrek is a village in the Hassa District, Hatay Province, Turkey. The village had a population of 1,260 in 2022.

In late 19th century, German orientalist Martin Hartmann listed the village as a settlement inhabited by Turks and 1 household of Armenian Catholics.

References

Villages in Hassa District